Miltochrista dentata is a moth of the family Erebidae. It was described by Wileman in 1910. It is found in Taiwan.

References

 Natural History Museum Lepidoptera generic names catalog

dentata
Moths described in 1910
Moths of Taiwan